

1977

External links
 Soviet films of 1977 at the Internet Movie Database

1977
Soviet
Films